"I Found a Girl" is a song written by P. F. Sloan and Steve Barri, and recorded by 1960s American pop singers, Jan and Dean. "I Found a Girl" reached up to number 30 on the US Billboard Hot 100 on November 20, 1965. The song was a much bigger hit in Canada, where it reached number two.

Charts

References

External links
 Lyrics of this song
 

1965 songs
1965 singles
Jan and Dean songs
Liberty Records singles
Songs written by P. F. Sloan
Songs written by Steve Barri